Edward Parmelee Morris (17 September 1853 - 16 November 1938) was an American classicist.

Life 

He was born on September 17, 1853, in Auburn, N.Y. He graduated from Yale College in 1874, then moved to Cincinnati where his father was living. On January 2, 1879, he married Charlotte Webster Humphrey; her father was the Reverend Z.M. Humphrey and a professor at Lane Seminary in Cincinnati. Humphrey and Morris had four children, Frances Humphrey (born 1880), Edward (born 1885), Margaret (born 1886), and Humphrey (born 1987). Edward died in infancy. Frances and Margaret both attended Bryn Mawr College. Morris died on November 16, 1938, in New York City.

Career 
From 1876 to 1877, he taught Latin and history at Purdue College and from 1877 to 1879 he taught Latin and mathematics at Lake Forest College.
From 1879 to 1884, Morris taught Greek at Drury College in Springfield, Missouri. In 1884, he became the Massachusetts Professor of Latin Language and Literature at Williams College and was first allowed a year's leave of absence, which he spent the universities of Leipzig and Jena. He returned to Yale as a professor of the Latin language and literature in 1891. He became a significant influence on the work of Arthur Leslie Wheeler, who became Sather Professor at Princeton.

Honors 
Morris received an L.H.D. from Williams in 1904 and a Litt.D. from Harvard University in 1909, on the inauguration of President Abbott Lawrence Lowell.

Bibliography 

Some of his notable books are:

 The Captives and Trinummus of Plautus
  The Mostellaria of Plautus; with explanatory notes
  On principles and methods in Latin syntax
 On the sentence-question in Plautus and Terence
 The study of Latin in the preparatory course

References 

American classical scholars
1853 births
1938 deaths
Yale College alumni